Operation Green Merchant was a nationwide investigation and operation targeting businesses advertising specialized horticultural equipment that was supposedly used to grow cannabis in the 1990s.

Background
The DEA had decided to investigate the advertising inside the High Times and Sinsemilla Tips with the goal of shutting down the blooming indoor marijuana industry using United Parcel Service records to trace deliveries of indoor growing equipment and seeds.

The three key targets of Green Merchant were the High Times magazine, Sinsemilla Tips magazine and the Holland's Seed Bank owned by Nevil Schoenmakers.

See also
Martin Heydt

References

External links
 Coverage on the matter

Anti-cannabis operations
Drug Enforcement Administration operations
Cannabis in California